Ahmed Rachedi (born 1938) is an Algerian film director and screenwriter. He was nominated for the Academy Award for Best Picture for the film Z (1969), which he helped produce. His 1971 film L'Opium et le Bâton was entered into the 7th Moscow International Film Festival. His 1981 film Ali in Wonderland won a Special Prize at the 12th Moscow International Film Festival.

Selected filmography
 L'Opium et le Bâton (1971)
 Ali in Wonderland (1981)
 C’était la guerre (1993, co-directed with Maurice Failevic)

References

External links

Algerian film directors
1938 births
Living people
21st-century Algerian people